Maryland's Legislative District 12 is one of 47 districts in the state for the Maryland General Assembly. It covers parts of Baltimore County and Howard County.

Demographic characteristics
As of the 2020 United States census, the district had a population of 130,272, of whom 101,992 (78.3%) were of voting age. The racial makeup of the district was 69,722 (53.5%) White, 27,474 (21.1%) African American, 571 (0.4%) Native American, 15,056 (11.6%) Asian, 69 (0.1%) Pacific Islander, 6,522 (5.0%) from some other race, and 10,851 (8.3%) from two or more races. Hispanic or Latino of any race were 12,261 (9.4%) of the population.

The district had 83,011 registered voters as of October 17, 2020, of whom 17,218 (20.7%) were registered as unaffiliated, 19,094 (23.0%) were registered as Republicans, 45,268 (54.5%) were registered as Democrats, and 895 (1.1%) were registered to other parties.

Political representation
The district is represented for the 2023–2027 legislative term in the State Senate by Clarence K. Lam (D) and in the House of Delegates by Jessica M. Feldmark (D, District 12A), Terri L. Hill (D, District 12A), and Gary Simmons (D, District 12B).

References

Baltimore County, Maryland
Howard County, Maryland
12
12